Amphitrite was a 44-gun  of the French Navy that saw service during the Napoleonic Wars.

Ordered on 6 January 1806, Amphitrite was laid down at Cherbourg-en-Cotentin, France, in August 1806. She was launched on 11 April 1808 and completed later that year.

Amphitrite arrived at Fort-de-France, Martinique, only to find it blockaded by the British Royal Navy. She managed to slip through and reach the harbour. On 3 February 1809, as the British attacked Martinique, the French scuttled Amphitrite to prevent her capture.

In 1960, construction work on a modern commercial harbour in Fort de France uncovered the bottom of the hull of Amphitrite. Copper sheets of the hull and other fragments were recovered and are now on display at the Service Régional de l'Archéologie.

References

Age of Sail frigates of France
Shipwrecks in the Caribbean Sea
1808 ships
Armide-class frigates
Maritime incidents in 1809
Ships built in France
Scuttled vessels